Robert Corbet was a Royal Navy officer.

Robert Corbet may also refer to:

Robert Corbet (MP for Worcestershire), MP for Worcestershire 1341
Robert Corbet (died 1417), MP for Wiltshire 1385,1397, Hertfordshire 1402, 1404 and Suffolk 1414
Robert Corbet (died 1420) (1383–1420), MP for Shropshire 1413, 1419
Robert Corbet (died 1583) (1542–1583), MP for Shropshire 1563
Robert Corbet (died 1676), Parliamentarian politician of the English Civil War and MP for Shropshire in the First Protectorate Parliament of 1654
Sir Robert Corbet, 4th Baronet (c. 1670–1740), of the Corbet baronets, MP for Shropshire 1705–10, 1715–22
Robert Corbet, author of young adult fiction titles such as Shelf Life

See also
Robert Corbett (disambiguation)
Corbet (surname)